, abbreviated as  is a Japanese manga series written and illustrated by . It has been serialized on Comic Ryū Web since 2020. A live-action television drama adaptation produced by Asahi Broadcasting Corporation (ABC) is slated for release in October 2022.

Synopsis
Nekoyashiki is a highly popular creator at  conventions, and uses this popularity to fulfill his desire for external validation. At a convention he has a chance reunion with Kazama Issei, a childhood friend he once had a crush on, and who now performs as an idol under the stage name "Issay".

Media

Manga
KabeKoji began serialization on Comic Ryū Web in 2020. The series has been released as four collected  volumes published by Tokuma Shoten:

Television drama
A live-action television drama adaptation of KabeKoji was announced on June 9, 2022, and will premier on October 3, 2022. The series stars  as Nekoyashiki and Masaki Nakao as Issei, with Tatsunori Satō as director,  as writer, music by Yuta Mori, and Yosuke Inakuma, Kota Yamazaki, and Muneo Miyagawa as producers. Filming wrapped on the series on August 30, 2022.

Notes

References

External links
 Kabe Sa Dōjin Sakka no Nekoyashiki-kun wa Shōnin Yokkyū o Kojiraseteiru at Comic Ryū
 Official television drama adaptation website at Rakuten

2020 manga
2022 Japanese television series debuts
2020s Japanese LGBT-related television series
Asahi Broadcasting Corporation original programming
Comedy anime and manga
Japanese boys' love television series
Japanese comedy webcomics
Japanese LGBT-related drama television series
Japanese television dramas based on manga
LGBT in anime and manga
Seinen manga
Tokuma Shoten manga
Webcomics in print
Yaoi anime and manga